The 2015 Rutgers Scarlet Knights football team represents Rutgers University in the 2015 NCAA Division I FBS football season. It is the Scarlet Knights' second season as a member of the Big Ten Conference, and second as a member of the East Division. The team was led by Kyle Flood, in his fourth year as head coach, and play its home games at High Point Solutions Stadium in Piscataway, New Jersey.

The season began with controversies over an investigation into violations of NCAA regulations and school policy concerning coach Flood's improper contacting of a professor concerning a student's academic status; and the arrests and dismissal of several football players on violent felony charges connected to an April 2015 home invasion robbery in New Brunswick. Coach Flood was suspended for three games after the investigation found improper contact was made.

Before the season

Previous season
The 2014 Rutgers Scarlet Knights football team finished the regular season 7–5, with a highlight win against Michigan for the team's first Big Ten Conference win. After defeating Indiana the Scarlet Knights become bowl eligible and were invited to play in the Quick Lane Bowl against North Carolina of the Atlantic Coast Conference. Rutgers defeated the Tar Heels in Detroit, Michigan 40–21 finishing their 2014 Season at 8–5.

Controversies and legal issues
The 2015 football season began with the shadow of several incidents of alleged misconduct and criminal charges. On May 24, 2015, redshirt freshman defensive back Darian Dailey was arrested in Florida on felony robbery charges. In late August 2015, head coach Kyle Flood suspended five players from the first half of the season opener for violating team policies on breaking curfews. These players were Ruhann Peele (cornerback), Leonte Carroo (receiver), Tim Gleeson (punter), Chris Laviano (quarterback) and Kevin Marquez (linebacker). There were doubts that Flood would be coaching the season opener and some speculation amongst news media and fans about the possibility of Flood's firing or resignation. Around this time, many fans had called for the return of Flood's predecessor, Greg Schiano as head coach. According to The Asbury Park Press, students remarked that the recent controversies tarnish the university's reputation.

On September 3, 2015, ten suspects, including six players, were arrested and charged with felony assault, armed robbery, criminal restraint, conspiracy, riot, and weapons possession charges stemming from an April 26, 2015 incident in New Brunswick, New Jersey characterized as a home invasion robbery. One victim, identified only as a 19-year-old male Rutgers student was reported to have had his jaw broken in the assault. Five players—Ruhann Peele (cornerback), Nadir Barnwell (cornerback), Razohnn Gross (fullback), Delon Stephenson (free safety), and Andre Boggs (cornerback)—were dismissed from the team moments before the season-opening football game against the Norfolk State Spartans. Former player Tejay Johnson (free safety and wide receiver), was also arrested on September 3. A sixth player, Lloyd Terry (fullback) was arrested a few days later. Several of the players arrested in this incident had previous arrests in 2013 and 2014 for other criminal charges.

One of the suspects, Barnwell, was the center of an ongoing investigation into head coach Kyle Flood for possible violations of school policy and National Collegiate Athletic Association (NCAA) regulations prohibiting the athletic coaching staff from contacting faculty regarding the academic eligibility status of a player.  According to New Jersey Advance Media, publisher of the Star-Ledger and other statewide newspapers, Flood defied academic support staff by contacting one of Barnwell's professors and that sources stated that Flood attempted to "circumvent the process and trying to get the kid eligible".

Flood suspended wide receiver Leonte Carroo indefinitely after his arrest on September 13, 2015. Carroo was arrested by the Rutgers University Police Department and charged with simple assault stemming from a domestic violence incident that occurred on campus shortly after the end of the game against Washington State. Carroo was the seventh Rutgers player arrested in ten days. Star-Ledger and New Jersey Advance Media sports columnist Steve Politi described Carroo as "another casualty of the season from hell" and called the incident further proof that Flood had lost control of the team. Politi mused, "you wonder how soon before his head coach joins him on the list"—implying that Flood's tenure as coach should be ending with his termination.

The 15-member Rutgers Board of Governors, one of the school's two governing bodies, and university president Robert Barchi met on September 11 in a closed-door emergency session to discuss ongoing "athletic matters" and the potential for litigation in the wake of these controversies and arrests. On September 16, 2015, after the conclusion of a university-led investigation into his conduct determined he improperly contacted a professor to get Barnwell's grade changed, Flood was suspended for three games and fined $50,000 by Rutgers president Robert Barchi. Flood would be suspended during and miss an away game against Penn State (September 19, 2015), and home games against Kansas (September 26) and Michigan State (October 10). Associate head coach Norries Wilson would fill-in as head coach for those three games during Flood's suspension.

After Flood's reinstatement, questions continued to circulate about possible drug problems within the program in the wake of former Scarlet Knights' fullback Lloyd Terry telling police that "he failed multiple drug tests while on the football team". 

Flood, along with athletic director Julie Herman, was fired at the end of the season.

Coaching staff

Coaching changes
2014 offensive coordinator Ralph Friedgen relinquished his position as offensive coordinator due to age and stayed on as a special assistant to the head coach.

Ben McDaniels, 2014 wide receiver coach and brother of former Denver Broncos head coach and current New England Patriots offensive coordinator Josh McDaniels, was promoted to offensive coordinator.

2014 graduate assistant and former Rutgers defensive lineman Charlie Noonan was hired as defensive line coach at Holy Cross.

Graduate assistant Sam Williams' two years of graduate assistant-ship expired and was hired by Penn State working with special teams and recruiting quality control.

2014 Graduate assistant and former Rutgers quarterback Mike Teel was hired by his alma mater Don Bosco Preparatory High School as offensive coordinator

2014 undergraduate student assistant Sean Barowski stayed on as a graduate assistant upon graduating.

2015 staff

Schedule
Rutgers announced their 2015 football schedule on June 3, 2013. The 2015 schedule consist of 7 home, and 5 away games in the regular season. The Scarlet Knights will host Big Ten foes Maryland, Michigan State, Ohio State, and Nebraska and will travel to Indiana, Michigan, Penn State, and Wisconsin.

The Scarlet Knights hosted three of their four non conference games against Kansas, Norfolk State and Washington State. Rutgers will match up against Army on November 21 at Michie Stadium at West Point.

Schedule Source:

Game summaries

Home against Norfolk State

On September 5, 2015, the Rutgers Scarlet Knights met the Norfolk State Spartans, a Football Championship Subdivision team in the Mid-Eastern Athletic Conference, for the fourth game in their series. Rutgers had won the previous three games against Norfolk State in which the Scarlet Knights outscored the Spartans 128–0.

Home against Washington State

After last season's 41–38 victory against Washington State (Pac-12 Conference) on August 28, 2014, this was the second meeting between the Scarlet Knights and the Cougars. Rutgers lost after a penalty-prone fourth quarter (ending with a spike on 4th down), 34–37.

Away at Penn State

In the first game of head coach Kyle Flood's three-game suspension, associate head coach Norries Wilson filled in as head coach for the Rutgers and Penn State conference opener. Rutgers' only score was posted with 10:35 remaining in the fourth quarter by kicker Kyle Federico who made 34 yard field goal.

Home against Kansas

This was the first meeting between the Kansas Jayhawks (Big-12 Conference) and the Scarlet Knights. In 2012, Rutgers and Kansas announced two home-and-home series games this season and the 2018 season.

Home against Michigan State

Rutgers hosted the undefeated Michigan State Spartans for their sixth meeting. With Michigan State ranked number 4 in national polls, it was the first time in 6 seasons that Rutgers met a team ranked the top 25 (beating No 23-ranked USF 31–0 on November 12, 2009) and 8 seasons since they upset a No. 2-ranked South Florida in 2007.

This was the last game that interim head coach Norries Wilson coached during head coach Kyle Flood's three-game suspension.

Away at Indiana

Despite a 52–27 Indiana lead in the third quarter, the Scarlet Knights erased the 25-point deficit by converting three fourth-quarter turnovers into touchdowns and took the lead in the game's final seconds with a 26-yard field goal from Kyle Federico. Leonte Carroo caught seven passes, for 157 yards and three touchdowns before leaving in the second half with an injured right leg.

Home against Ohio State

Away at Wisconsin

Away at Michigan

Home against Nebraska

Away at Army

Home against Maryland

Roster

References

Rutgers
Rutgers Scarlet Knights football seasons
Rutgers Scarlet Knights football